Makuac Teny Youk is a South Sudanese politician. He was the former Minister for Youth, Sports and Recreation in the Cabinet of South Sudan. He was appointed to that position on 10 July 2011, and served until 2013.

References

Living people
Government ministers of South Sudan
Year of birth missing (living people)